William Earl Potteiger (February 11, 1893 – April 7, 1959) was an American football, baseball, and basketball player and coach. He played professionally in both baseball and football and coached professionally in basketball, baseball and football. Potteiger was player-coach for the New York Giants when they won their first National Football League championship in 1927. He also played minor league baseball from 1913 to 1917, in 1919, and from 1926 to 1927. He managed in the minors from 1926 to 1927 and in 1932.

References

External links
 Career statistics

1891 births
1959 deaths
American football halfbacks
Albright Lions baseball players
Albright Lions football players
Albright Lions men's basketball players
Buffalo All-Americans players
Charleston Sea Gulls players
Chicago Cardinals players
Conshohocken Athletic Club players
Lowell Grays players
Milwaukee Badgers players
New York Giants head coaches
New York Giants players
Kenosha Maroons players
Union Club of Phoenixville players
Ursinus Bears football players
People from Berks County, Pennsylvania
Players of American football from Pennsylvania
Wilkes-Barre Barons (baseball) players
Worcester Boosters players
Worcester Busters players
York White Roses players
American men's basketball players